State Route 447 (SR 447) is a state highway in the U.S. state of Nevada. The highway is almost entirely within Washoe County but does for a brief time enter Pershing County, Nevada. The highway connects the town of Gerlach to the remainder of the state via Wadsworth. Though passing through extremely remote and desolate areas of Nevada, the highway has recently gained fame as the primary route to access the Black Rock Desert, the site of the annual Burning Man festival. The state maintained portion ends at Gerlach; however the highway continues as Washoe County Route 447 from Gerlach north to the California state line near Cedarville.

A  portion of this highway, along with portions of SR 445 and SR 446, has been designated the Pyramid Lake Scenic Byway.

Route description

The route begins at a junction with Old US 40 in Wadsworth. The highway proceeds north following the path of the Truckee River, and passes along the east side of the river's terminus at Pyramid Lake near Nixon. The highway continues north following the western edge of Winnemucca Lake, a dry lake that once also was the terminus of the Truckee river. During this portion the highway straddles the Washoe/Pershing County line.

The highway enters the Black Rock Desert just before arriving at Empire, a city founded on processing gypsum extracted from the desert.

Just past where the official designation ends is the turn off for former State Route 34, which is used to access the large playa of the Black Rock Desert and the site of the annual Burning Man Festival.

County Route 447
The State highway officially ends here, becoming CR 447 where the roadbed continues as a Washoe county road 
 to the California State Line near the Lassen/Modoc county line. This road is frequently called the Gerlach-Cederville Road. Some maps erroneously list this road as part of State Route 447.

History
Before 1978, the present-day highway was part of SR 34 from Gerlach to Wadsworth, and former SR 81 from Gerlach to the California state line (now CR 447).

Ten solar energy arrays, totaling 451 kilowatts, have been installed along Nevada 447 with the help of Burning Man-related not-for-profit Black Rock Solar and Nevada's "Solar Generations" rebate program. Nevada Governor Jim Gibbons issued an August 18, 2010 proclamation declaring the road "to be America's Solar Highway".

Major intersections
This major intersections table lists junctions for both State Route 447 and Washoe County Route 447. All junctions are located in Washoe County.

See also

References

447
447
Transportation in Washoe County, Nevada
Transportation in Pershing County, Nevada